Penn Township is a township in Chester County, Pennsylvania, United States. The population was 5,364 at the 2010 census. It is home to the Nursery Capital of Pennsylvania and was the site of Sunset Park, one of country music's most popular venues.

Geography

Transportation

U.S. Route 1 is the most prominent highway serving Penn Township. It follows the Kennett Oxford Bypass along an east–west alignment through the middle of the township. Pennsylvania Route 796 also passes through the middle of the township, following Jennersville Road along a north–south alignment. Finally, Pennsylvania Route 896 follows Newark Road along a northwest–southeast alignment across the southwestern corner of the township.

Demographics

At the 2010 census, the township was 86.3% non-Hispanic White, 2.9% Black or African American, 0.1% Native American, 1.6% Asian, 0.1% Native Hawaiian or other Pacific Islander, and 1.1% were two or more races. 8.1% of the population were of Hispanic or Latino ancestry.

At the 2000 census there were 2,812 people, 1,026 households, and 759 families living in the township.  The population density was 293.2 people per square mile (113.2/km).  There were 1,093 housing units at an average density of 114.0/sq mi (44.0/km).  The racial makeup of the township was 93.24% White, 2.67% African American, 0.18% Native American, 0.32% Asian, 2.31% from other races, and 1.28% from two or more races. Hispanic or Latino of any race were 5.90%.

There were 1,026 households, 31.8% had children under the age of 18 living with them, 64.2% were married couples living together, 7.2% had a female householder with no husband present, and 26.0% were non-families. 23.0% of households were made up of individuals, and 13.1% were one person aged 65 or older.  The average household size was 2.65 and the average family size was 3.13.

The age distribution was 24.6% under the age of 18, 5.5% from 18 to 24, 27.2% from 25 to 44, 22.3% from 45 to 64, and 20.4% 65 or older.  The median age was 41 years. For every 100 females, there were 97.6 males.  For every 100 females age 18 and over, there were 95.3 males.

The median household income was $57,949 and the median family income  was $68,938. Males had a median income of $46,298 versus $30,880 for females. The per capita income for the township was $26,346.  About 3.0% of families and 6.2% of the population were below the poverty line, including 4.9% of those under age 18 and 11.9% of those age 65 or over.

References

External links

Penn Township

Townships in Chester County, Pennsylvania
Townships in Pennsylvania